Ia H'Drai is a district in Kon Tum province, Vietnam.

References 

Districts of Kon Tum province